Maarheeze is a railway station in Maarheeze, The Netherlands.

History

Maarheeze had a station, closer to the centre which opened on 1 November 1913 and closed on 15 May 1938. A new station further south, next to the Philips buildings, was opened on 13 June 2010. The station lies on the Eindhoven–Weert railway and is located between Heeze and Weert.

Residents of Maarheeze have been asking for a station together since 2004. Construction work has started in October 2009.

With an interchange at Eindhoven passengers are able to reach many major places in the Netherlands, such as: Amsterdam, Utrecht, Amsterdam Airport Schiphol, The Hague, Venlo and Eindhoven Airport (by bus). In Weert passengers can change to trains towards Roermond, Maastricht and Heerlen.

Train service
The following services currently call at the station:
2x per hour local services (sprinter) Eindhoven - Weert

Bus service
The following bus services call at Maarheeze:
Hermes line 173 Eindhoven - Leende - Budel - Weert

External links
NS website 
Dutch Public Transport journey planner 

Railway stations in North Brabant
Railway stations opened in 1913
Railway stations opened in 2010
Railway stations closed in 1938
Cranendonck
1913 establishments in the Netherlands
Railway stations in the Netherlands opened in the 20th century